The women's javelin throw event at the 1988 World Junior Championships in Athletics was held in Sudbury, Ontario, Canada, at Laurentian University Stadium on 29 and 30 July.  An old specification 600g javelin was used.

Medalists

Results

Final
30 July

Qualifications
29 Jul

Group A

Group B

Participation
According to an unofficial count, 25 athletes from 20 countries participated in the event.

References

Javelin throw
Javelin throw at the World Athletics U20 Championships